Erin Warren (born December 31, 1971) is an American luger. She competed at the 1994 Winter Olympics and the 1998 Winter Olympics.

References

External links
 

1971 births
Living people
American female lugers
Olympic lugers of the United States
Lugers at the 1994 Winter Olympics
Lugers at the 1998 Winter Olympics
People from Winchester, Massachusetts
Sportspeople from Middlesex County, Massachusetts
21st-century American women